Carbimide may refer to:

 Carbon imide (carbodiimide, tautomer of cyanamide)
 Carbonyl imide (isocyanic acid)